Laura Beatriz Godoy Calle (born July 6, 1988) is a Guatemalan volleyball player, model and beauty pageant titleholder who was crowned Miss Guatemala 2011 and represented her country in the 2012 Miss Universe contest.

Early life
Godoy was born on July 6, 1988. She was a volleyball player for the Guatemalan national team.

Miss Guatemala 2012
Godoy was crowned Miss Universe Guatemala 2012 by Alejandra Barillas (Miss Universe Guatemala 2011) at the Convention Center Light, Real Life Evangelical Church, Zone 10 of Guatemala City on November 25, 2011. Godoy said that, as a beauty queen, she felt like an ambassador for her country. She said that she felt a great deal of pressure moving forward to the Miss Universe pageant because she was representing Guatemala instead of just representing herself.

Miss Universe 2012
Godoy competed in the 61st edition of the Miss Universe pageant. She was named Miss Congeniality Universe. She was the first Guatemalan to win the award.

Personal
In a 2013 interview, Godoy said that modeling was one of her passions but that she knew that it would eventually end. She said that she was about to stop her modeling career as she looked toward work in nutrition. She has also studied elementary education. In 2012, she said that her dream was to establish a nutrition education center.

References

External links

Official Miss Guatemala website

1988 births
Living people
Miss Guatemala winners
Miss Universe 2012 contestants